Entomognathus is a genus of wasps belonging to the family Crabronidae.

The species of this genus are found in Europe, Southern Africa, Southern Asia and Northern America.

Species:
 Entomognathus alaris
 Entomognathus alaris <small>Bohart, 1995

References

Crabronidae
Hymenoptera genera